Brand New Man is the debut studio album by American country music duo Brooks & Dunn. It was released on August 13, 1991, by Arista Records. Produced by Don Cook and Scott Hendricks, the album produced four consecutive Number One singles on the U.S. Billboard Hot Country Singles & Tracks (now Hot Country Songs) charts in "Brand New Man", "Boot Scootin' Boogie", "My Next Broken Heart", and "Neon Moon"; in addition, "Lost and Found" was a #6. The album was certified 6× Multi-Platinum by the RIAA for sales of six million copies.

Track listing

Charts

Weekly charts

Year-end charts

Certifications

Personnel

Brooks & Dunn
Kix Brooks – lead and backing vocals
Ronnie Dunn – lead and backing vocals

Additional musicians
Bruce Bouton – pedal steel guitar, lap steel guitar, slide guitar
Mark Casstevens – acoustic guitar, mandolin
Mike Chapman – bass guitar
Rob Hajacos – fiddle
John Barlow Jarvis – piano, keyboards
Brent Mason – electric guitar
John Wesley Ryles – backing vocals
Harry Stinson – backing vocals
Dennis Wilson – backing vocals
Lonnie Wilson – drums
Glenn Worf – bass guitar

References

1991 debut albums
Brooks & Dunn albums
Arista Records albums
Albums produced by Don Cook
Albums produced by Scott Hendricks